Jyoti Bane Jwala is a 1980 Indian Hindi-language action film, produced by Prasan Kapoor under the Tirupati Pictures Enterprises banner and directed by Dasari Narayana Rao. It stars Jeetendra, Vinod Mehra, Waheeda Rehman, Moushumi Chatterjee, Sarika in the pivotal roles and music composed by Laxmikant–Pyarelal. The film is a remake of the Telugu film Katakataala Rudraiah.

Plot
Suraj & Malti are love birds. Just before their wedding, Suraj dies in a motorbike accident, when Malti is pregnant. Hence, to protect his nobility Malti's father Chanrandas shifts to a remote area. Soon after delivery, he throws the newborn in a dustbin and announces his death. However, Ram Singh the allegiant for a deadly gangster Dharmdas detects and adopts him. Ram Singh & his wife Parvati rear him as Jyoti, and then they have a baby girl Aasha. Jyoti is always heckled as a dustbin by society, as infuriated he kills a person and flees. Years roll by, Jyoti turns into a notorious criminal Jwala, and as an unbeknownst, he associates with Dharmdas. Malti is knitted with DSP O.P. Bakshi without revealing the actuality and they are blessed with a son Inspector Arjun Bakshi who is appointed to apprehend Jwala. Besides, Aasha a pickpocket befriends another Anu and crushes Arjun disclosing her identity. Once, Dharmdas assigns Jwala a task to abduct a child of a millionaire, but he is unable to do so and surrenders to the police. In the prison, Jwala meets Ram Singh who is aware that Dharmdas has backstabbed and sentenced him on false allegations. Listening to it, Jwala flares up and plans an escape when Ram Singh dies. Jwala is injured in that attack when Anu rescues and Aasha identifies him as a long-lost brother. After ceasing Dharmdas Jwala tries to skip when he faces Malti and she recognizes him. Just after, Jwala learns about Aasha's love affair. So, he announces his death, purports as an honorable Kishore, and fixes her alliance. Though Malti identifies him maintains silence. Jwala & Anu also love each other. Besides, Arjun suspects and succeeds in unveiling Jwala when he absconds with Anu. In the chase, Anu dies which explodes Jwala and calls Arjun for the duel. Terror-stricken Malti obstructs Jwala and divulges the fact. Thereupon, Jwala blames Malti for her deed which resulted in heavy destruction, and recollects the life of Karna. Anyhow, Jwala succumbs to knowing that Aasha is pregnant. At last, Jwala returns Arjun to Malti, until, she dies out of contrition. Finally, the movie ends with Jwala again getting behind the bars.

Cast
 Jeetendra as Suraj / Jyoti /  Kishore / Jwala Singh
 Vinod Mehra as Police Inspector Arjun Bakshi
 Waheeda Rehman as Malti
 Moushumi Chatterjee as Anu
 Sarika as Asha
 Ashok Kumar as Dr. Bose
 Kader Khan as Dharamdas 
 Satyendra Kapoor as Parvati's Husband
 Seema Deo as Parvati
 Shreeram Lagoo as S.P. Bakshi
 Iftekhar as Mr. Berde (Jailor)
 Sanjeev Kumar as Special Appearance
 Rekha as Courtesan (Special Appearance)

Soundtrack 
Lyrics: Anand Bakshi

References

External links
 

1980s Hindi-language films
1980 films
Indian action films
Films directed by Dasari Narayana Rao
Films scored by Laxmikant–Pyarelal
Hindi remakes of Telugu films
1980 action films